Anorthite is the calcium endmember of the plagioclase feldspar mineral series. The chemical formula of pure anorthite is CaAl2Si2O8. Anorthite is found in mafic igneous rocks. Anorthite is rare on the Earth but abundant on the Moon.

Mineralogy 

Anorthite is the calcium-rich endmember of the plagioclase solid solution series, the other endmember being albite (NaAlSi3O8). Anorthite also refers to plagioclase compositions with more than 90 molecular percent of the anorthite endmember.

Occurrence
Anorthite is a rare compositional variety of plagioclase. It occurs in mafic igneous rock. It also occurs in metamorphic rocks of granulite facies, in metamorphosed carbonate rocks, and corundum deposits.  Its type localities are Monte Somma and Valle di Fassa, Italy. It was first described in 1823.  It is more rare in surficial rocks than it normally would be due to its high weathering potential in the Goldich dissolution series.

It also makes up much of the lunar highlands; the Genesis Rock, collected during the 1971 Apollo 15 mission, is made of anorthosite, a rock composed largely of anorthite. Anorthite was discovered in samples from comet Wild 2, and the mineral is an important constituent of Ca-Al-rich inclusions in rare varieties of chondritic meteorites.

See also 
List of minerals

References 

Tectosilicates
Calcium minerals
Feldspar
Triclinic minerals
Gemstones
Minerals in space group 2